The 2021 Estonian Supercup was the 26th edition of the annual football match played between the winners of the previous season's Meistriliiga and the previous season's Estonian Cup respectively. As Flora won both competitions in 2020, their opponents were the 2020 Meistriliiga runners-up, Paide.

The match was played at the Lilleküla Stadium on 5 March 2021. Flora defended the trophy they won in 2019, winning 1–0, with the only goal coming in the 52nd minute and was scored by Rauno Sappinen. It was Flora's 11th overall title in the competition, four more than any other club.

Match

Details

See also
2020 Meistriliiga
2019–20 Estonian Cup

References

2021 in Estonian football
Football cup competitions in Estonia
Estonian Supercup
Sports competitions in Tallinn